James Aloysius Hickey (October 11, 1920 – October 24, 2004) was an American cardinal of the Roman Catholic Church. He served as Archbishop of Washington from 1980 to 2000, and was elevated to the cardinalate in 1988. Hickey previously served as bishop of the Diocese of Cleveland in Ohio from 1974 to 1980. 

Hickey presided over a significant expansion of social services for the poor and sick in the Washington region by the Archdiocese of Washington.  He was also a strong critic of American foreign policy in Nicaragua and El Salvador, and an advocate for nuclear disarmament.

Biography

Early life 
James Hickey was born on October 11, 1920, in Midland, Michigan, to James and Agnes (née Ryan) Hickey; he had an older sister, Marie. James Hickey was a dentist who, during the Great Depression, treated patients who could not pay for their dental care. At age 13, James Hickey entered St. Joseph Minor Seminary in Grand Rapids, Michigan. He graduated as valedictorian from Sacred Heart Major Seminary in Detroit in 1942. While in the seminary, Hickey helped provide pastoral care to migrant workers. He then attended The Catholic University of America in Washington, D.C.

Priesthood 
Hickey was ordained to the priesthood for the Diocese of Saginaw by Bishop William Murphy on June 15, 1946. He then served as an associate pastor at St. Joseph's Parish in Saginaw, Michigan until 1947.  Hickey went to Rome in 1947 to further his studies. He earned a Doctor of Canon Law degree from the Pontifical Lateran University in 1950, and a Doctor of Theology degree from the Pontifical University of St. Thomas Aquinas (Angelicum) in 1951. 

After returning to Michigan, he served as secretary to Bishop Stephen Woznicki from 1951 to 1966. He was also the founding rector of St. Paul Seminary. From 1962 to 1965, Hickey attended the Second Vatican Council in Rome as a peritus for Bishop Woznicki. Hickey was raised to the rank of domestic prelate of his holiness on October 31, 1963.

Auxiliary Bishop of Saginaw 
On February 18, 1967, Hickey was appointed as auxiliary bishop of the Diocese of Saginaw and titular bishop of Taraqua by Pope Paul VI. He received his episcopal consecration on April 14 1957, from Archbishop John Dearden, with Bishops Woznicki and Stephen Leven serving as co-consecrators, at the Cathedral of St. Mary. Hickey selected as his episcopal motto: Veritatem In Caritate, meaning, "Truth in Charity" (Ephesians 4:15).

Hickey served as chairman of priestly formation within the United States Conference of Catholic Bishops (USCCB) from 1968 to 1969. In March 1969, he became rector of the Pontifical North American College in Rome, where he would oversee the formation of American seminarians for the next five years.

Bishop of Cleveland
Hickey was named the eighth bishop of the Diocese of Cleveland on May 31, 1974 by Paul VI. Replacing Bishop Clarence Issenmann, he was installed on July 16 1974. During his tenure in Cleveland, Hickey was a  advocate of racial unity and became active in justice issues involving El Salvador. In 1980, he traveled to El Salvador to attend the funeral of Archbishop Óscar Romero. Sister Dorothy Kazel and Jean Donovan, two women whom Hickey had commissioned to serve as missionaries in El Salvador, were later murdered there; he kept their photographs on the wall of his private chapel for the rest of his life.

Archbishop of Washington
Pope John Paul II appointed Hickey as archbishop of the Archdiocese of Washington on June 17, 1980. During the 1980's, Hickey lobbied members of the United States Congress to stop sending aid to the Contra insurgents in Nicaragua.  He also pushed his fellow American bishops to take strong stands against increased military spending and in favor of nuclear disarmament. Hickey was one of the first American bishops to address the issue of sexual abuse by clergy, which would become a nationwide scandal in 2002.

During the Salvadoran Civil War, Hickey opposed the Reagan administration's support for the military government of El Salvador. In 1981, Hickey told the US House Subcommittee on Inter-American Affairs: "Our position is to oppose military aid and intervention from all outside powers." He feared a Communist takeover in El Salvador but opposed sending military assistance, believing such weapons would strengthen repressive elements in security forces. In 1983, Hickey was dispatched by John Paul II on an apostolic visitation to investigate liturgical abuses in the Archdiocese of Seattle, then led by Archbishop Raymond Hunthausen. Commenting on the visitation, Hickey said, "It wasn't easy, you know."

Cardinal 
John Paul II created Hickey as cardinal priest of Santa Maria Madre del Redentore a Tor Bella Monaca in the consistory of June 28, 1988. At that point, Hickey was one of thirteen Americans in the College of Cardinals. That same year, Hickey was invited to lead a retreat for the pope and his household. Within the USCCB, Hiceky served as chairman of the Committee on Doctrine (1979–81), of the Committee on Human Values (1984–1987), and of the Committee on the Pontifical North American College (1989–1991; 1994–1997).

Hickey's tenure in Washington D.C. oversaw a significant expansion of Catholic Charities, which became the region's largest private social service agency.  He also established:

 The Archdiocesan Health Care Network 
 The Archdiocesan Legal Network, which provides pro bono care for the region's low income residents 
 Birthing and Care, which provides pre-natal, delivery and post-natal medical care to women in financial need
 Faith in the City, an initiative to revitalize inner-city Catholic schools 
 Victory Housing, which develops assisted and independent living for senior citizens 

In conjunction with Mother Teresa, Hickey also founded a Washington convent of the Missionaries of Charity for the care of the homeless and terminally ill. He once declared, "We serve the homeless not because they are Catholic, but because we are Catholic. If we don't care for the sick, educate the young, care for the homeless, then we cannot call ourselves the church of Jesus Christ."Hickey resigned as archbishop on November 21, 2000, after twenty years of service.

Views

In addition to his social activism, Hickey was known for his orthodox views regarding Catholic doctrine.

LBGT ministries
Hickey ordered New Ways Ministry, an unauthorized ministry for LGBT Catholics, to stop any operations on archdiocese property in the early 1980's.  He also forced Georgetown University to stop DignityUSA, a national LBGT ministry organization, from celebrating mass on campus in 1987.

Liturgical abuses 
Hickey complained about liturgical abuses at Holy Trinity Church in Georgetown, even sending then auxiliary bishop William E. Lori to investigate the Jesuit-run parish.

Contraception and abortion
Hickey halted archdiocesan funding for a crisis pregnancy center in College Park, Maryland, after it declined to stop dispensing contraceptives.

Dissident clergy
As chancellor of The Catholic University of America, Hickey handled the ouster of theologian Charles Curran from the university's faculty in 1987. Curran had dissented from the church position on contraceptives In 1989, Hickey excommunicated  African-American priest George Stallings, a one-time protégé, after Stallings formed the unauthorized Imani Temple African-American Catholic Congregation.

HIV/AIDS
Hickey and Rev. Michael Peterson, a gay psychiatrist dying from AIDS on whom Hickey had relied for advice in treating pedophile priests, wrote a joint letter in 1987 to the American bishops acknowledging Peterson's diagnosis; Hickey wrote, "Father Peterson's illness reminds us in a personal way of the terrible human tragedy of AIDS in our midst. His suffering challenges us to reach out with renewed conviction and compassion to those with AIDS and their families and friends."

Capital punishment
In early 2000, following on the Pope's calls for Catholics to oppose capital punishment, Hickey appealed to Maryland Governor Parris Glendening to commute the death sentence of Eugene Colvin-El.

Labor
While Archbishop of Washington, Hickey ordered all large scale building projects in the archdiocese to be union jobs.

Death
Hickey died at the Jeanne Jugan Home of the Little Sisters of the Poor in Washington, D.C., at age 84. Following a funeral mass at the National Shrine of the Immaculate Conception, he was buried in St. Francis Chapel at St. Matthew's Cathedral. When asked by The Washington Post in 1989 what he would like people to say about him after his death, Hickey replied, "First, I'd like them to say that he was always loyal to his Church. Second, that he was a friend to Catholic education. And third, if they don't want to say the first two, at least I hope they would chisel on the stone, 'He served the poor.'"According to a 2020 Vatican report, Hickey failed to act on credible accusations of sexual abuse against then-Cardinal Theodore McCarrick and continued to offer his support and endorsement to McCarrick.

References

External links
Hickey's obituary on the CBC's website
Cardinal Hickey of Washington dies at 84 – Capital News 9 (Albany, N.Y.)
Hickey's death at WTOPNews.com

1920 births
2004 deaths
People from Midland, Michigan
20th-century American cardinals
Sacred Heart Major Seminary alumni
Catholic University of America alumni
Roman Catholic bishops of Cleveland
Roman Catholic archbishops of Washington
American religious leaders
Participants in the Second Vatican Council
Cardinals created by Pope John Paul II
Pontifical Lateran University alumni
Pontifical North American College alumni
Pontifical North American College rectors
Pontifical University of Saint Thomas Aquinas alumni
21st-century American cardinals
Catholics from Michigan